Herbert S. Walters (1891–1973) was a U.S. Senator from Tennessee from 1963 to 1964. Senator Walters may also refer to:

Bill Walters (Arkansas politician) (1943–2013), Arkansas State Senate
Chris Walters (born 1986), West Virginia State Senate
J. Henry Walters (1874–1952), New York State Senate
Michael P. Walters (born 1956), North Carolina State Senate
Mimi Walters (born 1962), California State Senate

See also
D. P. Walter (fl. 1870s), Nevada State Senate